Joseph Gaudet (May 10, 1818 – August 4, 1882) was a Quebec farmer and political figure. He represented Nicolet in the House of Commons of Canada as a Conservative Party of Canada member from 1867 to 1877. He represented Nicolet in the Legislative Assembly of Quebec from 1867 to 1871, and 

He was born Joseph Godet in Gentilly, Lower Canada in 1818 and became a farmer in that region. He was elected to the Legislative Assembly of the Province of Canada for Nicolet in 1858; he was reelected in 1861 and 1863 as a member of the parti bleu. In 1867, he was elected to both the federal and provincial parliaments. He supported the Programme catholique, an election manifesto developed in 1871 with the support of bishop Ignace Bourget and Monsignor Louis-François Laflèche, which led to his support by the Catholic clergy in Quebec. In 1877, he was named to the Legislative Council of Quebec for Kennebec division and he served until his death in Gentilly in 1882.

His son Athanese also later represented Nicolet in the House of Commons.

References
 
 
 

1818 births
1882 deaths
Members of the Legislative Assembly of the Province of Canada from Canada East
Conservative Party of Quebec MNAs
Conservative Party of Quebec MLCs
Conservative Party of Canada (1867–1942) MPs
Members of the House of Commons of Canada from Quebec
People from Centre-du-Québec